Joyce May Racek (later Markley, later Budrunas, August 16, 1938 – August 4, 2001) was an American artistic gymnast. She competed at the 1956 Summer Olympics with the best individual result of 42nd place in the floor exercise.

Racek took up gymnastics aged four. The family moved to Chicago, IL in 1941. In 1956 she graduated from Lake View High School and then studied at a college in Michigan. She then moved to Sarasota Florida with her first husband Bill Markley, but they later divorced. Her first three children remained with her in the divorce, and her newborn daughter was adopted. In the early 1970s Racek lived in Australia with her first three children and her second husband Paul Budrunas. Later she moved back to the US to Littleton, Colorado, where Racek and Budrunas ended their marriage.

Racek died of lung cancer. She was survived by her sisters Gale Gerhardt Hollinger and Donna Cuesta, and her children Bret Markley, Bart Markley, Jolinda Doudy and Pamela Hanson Carbone.

References

1938 births
2001 deaths
Gymnasts at the 1956 Summer Olympics
Olympic gymnasts of the United States
American female artistic gymnasts
Deaths from lung cancer
Deaths from cancer in Colorado
People from Columbia County, Wisconsin
Sportspeople from Wisconsin
Sportspeople from Littleton, Colorado
20th-century American women
20th-century American people